Mert Yılmazyerli (born 17 September 1992) is a Turkish chess player. He is a Turkish Chess Champion in 2021.

Life and career 
Yılmazyerli was born in Turkey in 1992, studied at Manisa Celal Bayar University. As a chess player, he earned FIDE title, International Master (IM) in 2014 and became Grandmaster (GM) in 2022. He won the 2021 Turkish Chess Championship and was the runner-up in the 2016 Turkish Chess Championship. He played for the Turkish national team at 21st European Team Chess Championship held in Hersonissos 2017.

Achievements 
 2021 Turkish Chess Championship – Champion
 2019 Turkish Rapid and Blitz Chess Championship - 2nd
 2016 Turkish Chess Championship – 2nd

References

External links 
 

1992 births
Living people
Turkish chess players

Chess grandmasters